Alfred Baum (born 10 February 1952 in Wickede) is a West German retired slalom canoeist who competed from the late 1960s to the mid-1970s. He won a bronze medal in the K-1 team event at the 1971 ICF Canoe Slalom World Championships in Meran. Baum also finished fifth in the K-1 event at the 1972 Summer Olympics in Munich.

References
 Sports-reference.com profile

1952 births
Canoeists at the 1972 Summer Olympics
German male canoeists
Living people
Olympic canoeists of West Germany
Medalists at the ICF Canoe Slalom World Championships